A sub-brown dwarf or planetary-mass brown dwarf is an astronomical object that formed in the same manner as stars and brown dwarfs (i.e. through the collapse of a gas cloud) but that has a planetary mass, therefore by definition below the limiting mass for thermonuclear fusion of deuterium (about ).
Some researchers call them rogue planets whereas others call them planetary-mass brown dwarfs. They are sometimes categorized as Y spectral class brown dwarfs.

Description
Sub-brown dwarfs are formed in the manner of stars, through the collapse of a gas cloud (perhaps with the help of photo-erosion) but there is no consensus amongst astronomers on whether the formation process should be taken into account when classifying an object as a planet. Free-floating sub-brown dwarfs can be observationally indistinguishable from rogue planets, which originally formed around a star and were ejected from orbit. Similarly, a sub-brown dwarf formed free-floating in a star cluster may be captured into orbit around a star, making distinguishing sub-brown dwarfs and large planets also difficult. A definition for the term "sub-brown dwarf" was put forward by the IAU Working Group on Extra-Solar Planets (WGESP), which defined it as a free-floating body found in young star clusters below the lower mass cut-off of brown dwarfs.

Lower mass limit
The smallest mass of gas cloud that could collapse to form a sub-brown dwarf is about 1 Jupiter mass (MJ). This is because to collapse by gravitational contraction requires radiating away energy as heat and this is limited by the opacity of the gas. A 3 MJ candidate is described in a 2007 paper.

List of possible sub-brown dwarfs

Orbiting one or more stars
There is no consensus whether these companions of stars should be considered sub-brown dwarfs or planets.
 WD 0806-661 B
 DT Virginis c
 FW Tauri b
 HD 106906 b
 ROXs 42Bb

Orbiting a brown dwarf
There is no consensus whether these companions of brown dwarfs should be considered sub-brown dwarfs or planets.
 The 5–10MJ companion of 2MASS J04414489+2301513
 2M1207b

Free-floating
Also called rogue planets:
WISE 0855–0714 3–10 MJ about 7 light years away
S Ori 52 
UGPS 0722-05 10–25 MJ 13 light years away
Cha 110913-773444 5–15 MJ 163 light years away
CFBDSIR 2149−0403 4–7 MJ 130 light years away
OTS 44 11.5 MJ 550 light years away

See also 

 Brown dwarf
 Fusor (astronomy)
 Giant planet
 Hot Jupiter
 Red dwarf
 Rogue planet
 Substellar object
 List of planet types
 Lists of astronomical objects

References 

+
Types of planet
Planemos
Free-floating substellar objects